The women's 100 metres event at the 2014 African Championships in Athletics was held August 10–11 on Stade de Marrakech.

Medalists

Results

Heats
Qualification: First 3 of each heat (Q) and the next 4 fastest (q) qualified for the semifinals.

Wind: Heat 1: -0.3 m/s, Heat 2: -0.2 m/s, Heat 3: -0.5 m/s, Heat 4: +0.8 m/s

Semifinals
Qualification: First 3 of each semifinal (Q) and the next 2 fastest (q) qualified for the final.

Wind: Heat 1: -0.3 m/s, Heat 2: +1.2 m/s

Final
Wind: -1.4 m/s

References

2014 African Championships in Athletics
100 metres at the African Championships in Athletics
2014 in women's athletics